David "Dai" Rees (birth unknown – death unknown) was a Welsh rugby union and professional rugby league footballer who played in the 1920s and 1930s, and coached rugby league in the 1930s through to the 1960s.

Playing career

International honours
Dai Rees won a cap for Other Nationalities (RL) while at Halifax, won 6 caps for Wales (RL) in 1921–32 while at Halifax, and won a cap for Great Britain (RL) while at Halifax in 1926 against New Zealand.

Dai Rees was selected for Great Britain while at Halifax for the 1924 Great Britain Lions tour of Australia and New Zealand, he did not play in any of the Test matches on this tour.

County Honours
Dai Rees won a cap for Glamorgan and Monmouthshire while at Halifax.

Challenge Cup Final appearances
Dai Rees played left-, i.e. number 11, in Halifax's 22-8 victory over York in the 1930–31 Challenge Cup Final during the 1930–31 season at Wembley Stadium, London on Saturday 2 May 1931, in front of a crowd of 40,368.

Club career
Dai Rees made his début for Haifax on  27 August 1921, and he played his last match for Halifax on 16 January 1932.

Coaching career

Club career
Dai Rees was the coach of Bradford Northern from 1936 to 1960, during these 24-years Bradford Northern won every honour in British rugby league.

Honoured at Halifax
Dai Rees is a Halifax Hall Of Fame Inductee.

References

External links
!Great Britain Statistics at englandrl.co.uk (statistics currently missing due to not having appeared for both Great Britain, and England)
Photograph "Ernest Ward holds the Cup aloft" at rlhp.co.uk
Photograph "Dai Rees" at rlhp.co.uk
Search for "David Rees" at britishnewspaperarchive.co.uk
Search for "Dai Rees" at britishnewspaperarchive.co.uk
Search for "Glamorgan & Monmouthshire" at britishnewspaperarchive.co.uk
Search for "Glamorgan and Monmouthshire" at britishnewspaperarchive.co.uk

Abertillery RFC players
Bradford Bulls coaches
Footballers who switched code
Glamorgan and Monmouthshire rugby league team players
Great Britain national rugby league team players
Halifax R.L.F.C. players
Other Nationalities rugby league team players
Place of birth missing
Place of death missing
Rugby league second-rows
Wales national rugby league team players
Welsh rugby league coaches
Welsh rugby league players
Welsh rugby union players
Year of birth missing
Year of death missing
Rugby league players from Abertillery
Rugby union players from Abertillery